Alkermes plc is a pharmaceutical company that focuses on central nervous system (CNS) diseases like multiple sclerosis. They also make medication for schizophrenia, bipolar disorder, depression, and addiction. The company was founded in 1987 by Michael Wall.  In September 2011 Alkermes, Inc. merged with Elan Drug Technologies (EDT), the former drug formulation and manufacturing division of Élan Corporation, plc. The company is headquartered in Dublin, and has an R&D center in Waltham, Massachusetts, and manufacturing facilities in Athlone, Ireland, and Wilmington, Ohio.

Products
Alkermes has more than 20 commercial drug products and candidates that address serious and chronic illnesses, including schizophrenia, depression, addiction, and diabetes mellitus. Among these products, five are primary to the company: risperidone (microspheres) long-acting injectable (Risperdal Consta) for schizophrenia and bipolar 1 disorder, paliperidone palmitate (Invega Sustenna in the U.S., Xeplion in Europe) for schizophrenia, 4-aminopyridine (Ampyra in the U.S., Fampyra in Europe) to improve walking in patients with multiple sclerosis, naltrexone for extended-release injectable suspension (Vivitrol) for alcohol and opioid use disorders, and exenatide extended-release for injectable suspension (Bydureon) for the treatment of type 2 diabetes. Bydureon is a once-weekly, extended-release form of the drug exenatide (Byetta), and was developed through a partnership between Amylin Pharmaceuticals, Alkermes and Eli Lilly. It is approved in Europe and the U.S.

Olanzapine/samidorphan (Lybalvi) is an atypical antipsychotic and opioid modulator combination intended for the treatment of schizophrenia and bipolar mania; the addition of samidorphan is intended to reduce the risk of weight gain and metabolic syndrome associated with olanzapine alone. In June 2021, ALKS-3831 was accepted under the brand name Lybalvi for use in schizophrenia and bipolar disorder, in the latter as both an acute treatment for mania and mixed episodes as well as a maintenance therapy alone or in combination with lithium or valproate.

In November 2022, Alkermes announced that it planned to spin out the interleukin-2 (IL-2) drug nemvaleukin alfa and two additional cytokine therapeutics into a separate oncology company.

References

Pharmaceutical companies of Ireland
Manufacturing companies based in Dublin (city)
Companies listed on the Nasdaq
Life sciences industry
Tax inversions